Qezeljeh (also known as Kyzyldzha, Qizilia, and Qizilja) is a village in Chehregan Rural District, Tasuj District, Shabestar County, East Azerbaijan Province, Iran. At the 2006 census, its population was 231, in 62 families.

References 

Populated places in Shabestar County